Cristian Mauriel Gutiérrez Peralta (born 6 January 1993) is a Nicaraguan footballer who plays as a centre back for Liga Primera club Real Estelí FC and the Nicaragua national team.

References

1993 births
Living people
People from Nueva Segovia Department
Nicaraguan men's footballers
Association football central defenders
Real Estelí F.C. players
C.D. Walter Ferretti players
Nicaraguan Primera División players
Nicaragua international footballers